McKee is an unincorporated community and census-designated place (CDP) in Blair County, Pennsylvania, United States. It was first listed as a CDP prior to the 2020 census.

The CDP is in southern Blair County, in the eastern part of Freedom Township and the southern corner of Blair Township. It sits on both sides of Halter Creek, where the stream exits from a water gap between Short Mountain to the north and Dunning Mountain to the south. Halter Creek is a northwestward-flowing tributary of the Frankstown Branch Juniata River, part of the Susquehanna River watershed.

McKee is bordered to the west by East Freedom. Woodbury Pike, carrying Pennsylvania Routes 36 and 164, passes through the center of McKee, leading northwest  to Interstate 99 at Leamersville and southeast through the Halter Creek water gap  to Roaring Spring.

Demographics

References 

Census-designated places in Blair County, Pennsylvania
Census-designated places in Pennsylvania